Jorge Augusto da Cunha Gabriel, better known as Jorginho, is a Brazilian former beach soccer player who played as a winger. In 2018, his retirement from the sport was announced, however he made one final appearance for Brazil in January 2019, a testimonial match in which his friend Ronaldinho also participated.

Honours

Beach soccer
Brazil
FIFA Beach Soccer World Cup winner: 1996, 1997, 1998, 1999, 2000, 2002, 2003, 2004
FIFA Beach Soccer World Cup qualification (CONMEBOL) winner : 2005, 2006, 2011
Mundialito winner: 1996, 1997, 1999, 2000, 2001, 2004, 2011

Individual
FIFA Beach Soccer World Cup Top Scorer Golden Ball (MVP): 1999, 2004
Mundialito MVP: 2004

References

External links

Stats at FIFA

1974 births
Living people
Brazilian beach soccer players
Footballers from Rio de Janeiro (city)